Clayne Robison is a professor of voice at Southern Virginia University. He previously served as the director of the Brigham Young University opera program.  He is a specialist in the study of vocal beauty.

Robison is a native of Boise, Idaho.  He received his bachelor's degree from Brigham Young University and then received a Juris Doctor degree from Harvard Law School.  However, he later took an MMus and then a DMA, both from the University of Washington.  Robison composed a piece of music that was used for the dedication services of the Orson Hyde Memorial Garden in Jerusalem.

Robison became the director of BYU's opera program in 1973.  He was in charge of BYU's performance of Boris Godunov with Jerome Hines singing the lead at BYU in 1975.

Robison wrote the book Beautiful Singing: Mind Warp Moments.  Robison's wife Vivien is also a musician who has been an adjunct professor at BYU and a member of the Mormon Tabernacle Choir.

Robison is a Latter-day Saint.  Since retiring from BYU in 2006 he has served a mission with his wife for the LDS Church in Austria and Germany.  Robison and his wife Vivien were members of the Nauvoo University faculty for a short time. He also served as a professor at  Southern Virginia University.  Robison now teaches vocal lessons from home.

Sources

 
Robison's website
Deseret News. Aug 20, 2006
BYU Newsnet article, 20 Jan, 2006

American male composers
21st-century American composers
Latter Day Saints from Idaho
Brigham Young University alumni
Brigham Young University faculty
Harvard Law School alumni
Living people
American Mormon missionaries in Austria
American Mormon missionaries in Germany
University of Washington School of Music alumni
21st-century Mormon missionaries
Southern Virginia University faculty
Latter Day Saints from Massachusetts
Latter Day Saints from Washington (state)
Latter Day Saints from Utah
Latter Day Saints from Virginia
Year of birth missing (living people)